The Oat Hills are a mountain range in Colusa County, California.

References 

Hills of California
Mountain ranges of Colusa County, California
California Coast Ranges
Mountain ranges of Northern California